Sylvio de Souza (born 1935) is a Brazilian rower. He competed in the men's coxed four event at the 1956 Summer Olympics.

References

1935 births
Living people
Brazilian male rowers
Olympic rowers of Brazil
Rowers at the 1956 Summer Olympics
Place of birth missing (living people)
Pan American Games medalists in rowing
Pan American Games bronze medalists for Brazil
Rowers at the 1967 Pan American Games